Michel Bernard (3 November 1932 – 19 February 2021) was a French politician.

Biography
Prior to his political career, Bernard was a member of the Conseil économique et social du Limousin. He ran for and won a seat in the French National Assembly in 1986, representing the department of Haute-Vienne. In the 1989 French municipal elections, he ran for Mayor of Limoges, but was defeated by Socialist incumbent Louis Longequeue by 669 votes.

Michel Bernard died on 19 February 2021 at the age of 88.

References

1932 births
2021 deaths
20th-century French politicians
Rally for the Republic politicians
People from Charente-Maritime
Deputies of the 8th National Assembly of the French Fifth Republic
French general councillors
Place of death missing